I Wake Up Screaming is the fourteenth and most recent studio album released by the American musical group Kid Creole and the Coconuts. It was released in 2011 and includes the single "I Do Believe". The title of the album comes from the 1941 film noir I Wake Up Screaming.

Reception

Track listing

References

External links
 I Wake Up Screaming at Metacritic
 I Wake Up Screaming at Discogs

2011 albums
Kid Creole and the Coconuts albums